Szabolcs Csorba (born 24 October 1991) is a Hungarian football player currently playing for the Bangladeshi team Dhaka Abahani as a forward.

Club statistics

Updated to games played as of 4 August 2012.

External links 
MLSZ

1991 births
Living people
Sportspeople from Debrecen
Hungarian footballers
Association football midfielders
Debreceni VSC players